Varnameh (also known as Varghameh) is a village in Qalayi Rural District, Firuzabad District, Selseleh County, Lorestan Province, Iran. At the 2006 census, its population was 149, in 29 families.

References 

Towns and villages in Selseleh County